Chugoku Communication Network (Hiroshima P-station) is a Japanese local FM radio station in Naka-ku, Hiroshima.

The station was found on May 20, 1987 and aired on May 1, 2000.

External links
Hiroshima P-station

Mass media in Hiroshima
Radio stations in Japan
Companies based in Hiroshima Prefecture
Radio stations established in 1987